Christopher James Lister Sandbach (born 17 November 1985) is an English former first-class cricketer.

Sandbach was born at Oxford in November 1985. He was educated at Cheltenham College, before going up to Oxford Brookes University. While studying at Oxford Brookes he played first-class cricket for Oxford UCCEin 2007, making two appearances against Glamorgan and Leicestershire. In addition to playing first-class cricket, Sandbach also played minor counties cricket for Oxfordshire between 2006–10, making sixteen appearances in the Minor Counties Championship and eleven appearances in the MCCA Knockout Trophy.

References

External links

1985 births
Living people
Cricketers from Oxford
People educated at Cheltenham College
Alumni of Oxford Brookes University
English cricketers
Oxfordshire cricketers
Oxford MCCU cricketers